MasterChef USA is an American competitive cooking show that aired on PBS from 2000 to 2001. The series was hosted by Gary Rhodes. The series format was based directly on BBC's MasterChef, which used Rhodes as host during 2001. The show had two seasons.

The first season premiered on April 1, 2000 with a total of 13 half-hour-long episodes and 1 hour-long special. 27 contestants arose from the auditions held in each region, in which office manager Nancy Vaziri of Homewood, Illinois won the title of MasterChef 2000.

The second season started on April 7, 2001 with a total of 13 half-hour episodes and 1 hour-long special. Similarly, 27 contestants advanced; wherein business owner Geoffrey Hill of Evanston, Illinois was proclaimed as MasterChef 2001.

Production
Due to the success of the British Broadcasting Corporation cooking show MasterChef, PBS acquired rights to screen and West 175 make an American version of MasterChef.

When it came to finding a chef to present the show, executive producer Elizabeth Brock initially wanted British cook Gary Rhodes for the job. "He is so alive on camera," points out Brock. "And he also has the unique ability to combine true expertise on cooking with his gift of communicating in an entertaining style."

Summary
During the first 9 weeks, twenty-seven cooks from different regions faced-off in a challenge involving their best original two-course menu which must cost less than $60.00 and cook them in only two and a half hours. Nine contestants will be picked to move on to the next round where they will battle against another set of cooks from another region. From there, three will be picked to compete in the finale, where one of them will grab the coveted title for the next MasterChef.

Season 1
The first season saw 27 cooks battling for a spot in the semi-final round. A set of three cooks competed in the Southwestern, Southeastern, and Northwestern regions while six cooks competed in a two-part challenge in the Midwestern, Western, and Northeastern divisions. On May 27, 2000, the complete setlist of 27 cooks were revealed. In the end, medical practice office manager Nancy Vaziri of Homewood, Illinois was proclaimed MasterChef 2000, winning herself a trip to CuisinArt Resort and Spa, a $1000 Williams Sonoma gift certificate, a subscription to the International Association of Culinary Professionals and a short-term editorial for Bon Appétit.

Season 2
The second season, like its predecessor, witnessed 27 cooks battling for a spot in the semi-final round. A set of three cooks competed in the Southwestern, Southeastern, and Northwestern regions while six cooks competed in a two-part challenge in the Midwestern, Western, and Northeastern divisions. On June 2, 2001, the complete setlist of 27 cooks were revealed. In the end, small business owner Geoffrey Hill of Evanston, Illinois was announced MasterChef 2001, claiming prizes that included an all-expense-paid two-week stay at Cuisinarts Caribbean resort, Le Creuset cookware, $1000 Williams-Sonoma gift certificate and other cuisine-related prizes.

Celebrity judges
Every challenge featured a panel of two celebrity judges. Personalities are listed alphabetically:

 Colman Andrews - Regional Cook-off 1.6
 Lidia Bastianich - Regional Cook-off 1.3
 Rick Bayless - Semi-Finals 2.2
 A.J. Benza - Semi-Finals 2.2
 Tom Bergeron - Regional Cook-off 2.7
 Sissy Biggers - Semi-Finals 1.1
 David Brenner - Regional Cook-off 2.5
 Michael Chiarello - Regional Cook-off 2.8
 Claudia Cohen - Regional Cook-off 1.5 and Semi-Finals 1.2
 Bobby Collins - Regional Cook-off 2.1
 Jerry di Vecchio - Regional Cook-off 2.2
 Tom Douglas - Regional Cook-off 2.2
 Nathalie Dupree - Regional Cook-off 1.6
 Barbara Fairchild - Semi-Finals 2.1
 Susan Feniger - Regional Cook-off 2.1
 Benjamin Ford - Regional Cook-off 2.3
 Skitch Henderson - Regional Cook-off 1.1
 Madhur Jaffrey - Regional Cook-off 1.4
 Richard Kaupp - Regional Cook-off 2.7
 Robin Leach - Regional Cook-off 1.3
 Sheila Lukins - Semi-Finals 1.2
 Damian Mandola - Regional Cook-off 2.6
 Robin Mattson - MasterChef USA 1 and Grand Finale 1
 Mark Miller - Regional Cook-off 2.9
 Mary Sue Milliken - Regional Cook-off 2.5

 Donna Mills - Semi-Finals 2.3
 Joan Nathan - Semi-Finals 1.3
 Michel Nischan - Regional Cook-off 1.2
 Bill Nye the Science Guy - Regional Cook-off 2.8
 Carolyn O'Neil - Regional Cook-off 1.4
 Molly O'Neill - Regional Cook-off 1.7
 Mark Peel - Regional Cook-off 2.4
 Jacques Pépin - MasterChef USA Special 1 and Grand Finale 1
 Stephan Pyles - Regional Cook-off 1.8
 Thierry Rautureau - Regional Cook-off 1.5
 Suzanne Rogers - Regional Cook-off 2.6
 David Rosengarten - Regional Cook-off 1.1
 Vincent Schiavelli - Regional Cook-off 1.7
 Piero Selvaggio - Semi-Finals 2.1
 Suzanne Sena - Regional Cook-off 2.9
 B. Smith - Grand Finale 2
 Kit Skarstrom - Semi-Finals 1.1
 Jock Soto - Regional Cook-off 1.9
 Tanya Wenman Steel - Semi-Finals 1.3
 Laurin Sydney - Regional Cook-off 2.3
 Allyson Thurber - Semi-Finals 2.3
 Jacques Torres - Regional Cook-off 1.9
 Nancy Vaziri - Grand Finale 2
 George Wallace - Regional Cook-off 1.2 and Regional Cook-off 1.8
 Jacklyn Zeman - Regional Cook-off 2.4

Revival

On July 27, 2010, Fox premiered the similarly titled cooking show MasterChef among its primetime programs. The show, hosted and judged by British chef Gordon Ramsay and American restaurateurs Joe Bastianich and Graham Elliot, followed the new format of the BBC version.

References

External links
 

PBS original programming
USA
English-language television shows
2000s American cooking television series
2000 American television series debuts
2001 American television series endings
Cooking competitions in the United States